Ina Angelika Wester-Krieg (born October 28, 1964) is an American former competition swimmer who represented the United States at the 1992 Summer Olympics in Barcelona, Spain.  Wester-Krieg competed in the women's 200-meter butterfly, finishing sixth in the event final with a time of 2:11.46.

Wester-Krieg attended San Jose State University, where she swam for the San Jose State Spartans swimming and diving team in National Collegiate Athletic Association (NCAA) competition.

See also
 List of San Jose State University people

References

1964 births
Living people
American female butterfly swimmers
Olympic swimmers of the United States
People from Santa Clara, California
San Jose State Spartans women's swimmers
Swimmers at the 1991 Pan American Games
Swimmers at the 1992 Summer Olympics
Swimmers at the 1995 Pan American Games
Pan American Games gold medalists for the United States
Pan American Games silver medalists for the United States
Pan American Games bronze medalists for the United States
Pan American Games medalists in swimming
Medalists at the 1991 Pan American Games
Medalists at the 1995 Pan American Games